William Fox (born 1995) is an English organist, currently Sub-Organist of St Paul's Cathedral.

Fox was successively a chorister at York Minster, Junior Organ Scholar at Wells Cathedral and Organ Scholar at Hereford Cathedral. While in Hereford he became a Fellow of the Royal College of Organists (FRCO) and won the Turpin and Durrant prize. He then read Music at Magdalen College, Oxford, from where he graduated with First-Class Honours, and was Organ Scholar under the directorship of Daniel Hyde and Mark Williams.

Fox was appointed Sub-Organist at St Paul's Cathedral in October 2017, and took up the post in July 2018; He is the youngest person to be appointed to this position. In September 2019, he became a Junior Fellow of the Royal Birmingham Conservatoire, where he also studies. He won the 2018 Sir Anthony Lewis Memorial Prize Competition for piano accompaniment, at the Royal Academy of Music.

Fox's playing has been broadcast on BBC Radio 3, Classic FM, and BBC Television; he has recorded on the Opus Arte and Naxos labels.

Discography
 On Christmas Night (Choir of Magdalen College, Oxford)
 The Pillar of the Cloud (Choir of Magdalen College, Oxford)
 Cecilia McDowall: Organ Works

References 

English organists
1995 births
Living people